Abu Said Aq Sunqur al-Hajib (full name: Qasim ad-Dawla Aksungur al-Hajib) was the Seljuk governor of Aleppo under Sultan Malik Shah I. He was considered the de facto ruler of most of Syria from 1087. He was beheaded in 1094 following accusations of treason by Tutush I, the ruler of Damascus.

Aq-Sunqur was the father of Imad ad-Din Zengi, the founder of the Zengid dynasty. He died when his son Zengi was 10 years old.

Aleppo and Hama
Sultan Malik-Shah I made Aq-Sunqur the governor of Aleppo and Hama and the lands around it in 1087. They were suffering unrest at the time. He subsequently ruled for eight years.

Aleppo before his rule 
Because of the many conflicts between the rulers and princes of the regions, conditions within the city were difficult. A combination of high taxes and goods prices led to an increase in crime.

Reforms 
Aq-Sunqur began reforming by fixing the security situation in Aleppo and its environs. He activated the Hudud in Islam, repelling thieves and bandits and stamping out corruption. He increased the use of the police to secure civilian rights. He used the police authority to protect people rather than to control them. Aq-Sunqur created the "principle of collective responsibility" for every village or sector, which meant that if a village was raided by thieves, the whole village shared the responsibility of defending it.

Because of his policy to make order in the city, it became a suitable place for trading and farming, the economy recovered and inflation went down.

Theft protection 
He asked the people to not remove their goods from the road should they travel, stating that he would guarantee that their goods would not be stolen.

Legacy 
Ibn al-Qalanisi said in his book The history of Damascus: that he was just with the people, he protected the roads, guaranteed order, treated religion properly, attacked corruption and removed the bad people.

Ibn Kathir and Ali ibn al-Athir wrote about him and found that he had a good reputation.

Death 
Tutush I killed Aq-Sunqur in May 1094.

Sources

References 

1094 deaths
Assassinated Syrian people
11th-century Syrian people
Turkic rulers
People from Aleppo
Year of birth unknown
11th-century Turkic people
Government officials of the Seljuk Empire
Sultans of Aleppo